Diploderma menghaiense, also known as the Menghai mountain lizard, is a species of lizard native to China.

References 

Diploderma
Reptiles of China
Reptiles described in 2020
Taxa named by Natalia B. Ananjeva